Alison Margaret Wolf, Baroness Wolf of Dulwich,  (nee Potter, born 31 October 1949) is a British economist, academic, and life peer. She is the Sir Roy Griffiths Professor of Public Sector Management at King's College London; Director of the International Centre for University Policy Research, King's Policy Institute; and Director of the university's MSc programme in Public Sector Policy and Management. Her latest book is The XX Factor (published by Crown Books in the US and Profile Books in the UK).

Early life and education
Wolf was born on 31 October 1949. She was educated at Oxford High School, an all-girls private school in Oxford, England. She studied at the University of Neuchatel and Somerville College, Oxford.

Career

Her early career was spent in the United States as a policy analyst for the government.  She then worked many years at the Institute of Education of the University of London where she was guest professor. She is a member of the Advisory Committee for Education for the House of Commons of the United Kingdom and a member of the council of the United Nations University.  She writes frequent articles in the British press and moderated a programme on BBC Radio 4.  She is a member of the International Accounting Education Standards Board and has worked as a consultant for the European Commission, Bar Council, OECD, Royal College of Surgeons and the Ministries of Education of New Zealand, France and South Africa.

Wolf studies the interface between educational institutions and labour markets. She also has a research interest in performance studies, maths education, training, tertiary education and employment in the health sector.

In her book, Does Education Matter? Myths about Education and Economic Growth, she questioned the widespread view that higher public expenditure on education would increase economic growth. Instead, the causality ran in the opposite direction.  For the individual, the crucial skills in the labour market are primarily the mathematical and linguistic skills that are taught in school.  She therefore recommends investment in primary and secondary education rather than the tertiary level. In 2013, her book The XX Factor was published by Profile Books.

On 21 October 2014, it was announced that Wolf was to become a Crossbench life peer, having been nominated personally by the Prime Minister, David Cameron. She was created Baroness Wolf of Dulwich, of Dulwich in the London Borough of Southwark on 2 December 2014.

Personal life
Wolf is married to the economics journalist Martin Wolf. They have had three children together, two boys and a girl.

Honours
Wolf was appointed Commander of the Order of the British Empire (CBE) in the 2012 Birthday Honours for services to education. She is an Honorary Fellow of Somerville College, Oxford.

Publications
 Convergence and Divergence in European Education and Training Systems (with Green, A. and Leney, T.), Institute of Education (1999).
 Does Education Matter?: Myths About Education and Economic Growth, Penguin (2002).
 An Adult Approach to Further Education: How to Reverse the Destruction of Adult and Vocational Education, Institute of Economic Affairs (2009).
 Improving skills at work (with Evans, K.), Routledge (2010).
 The Wolf report  - Review of Vocational Education, UK Department for Education (2011).
 The XX Factor - published by Profile Books.

References

External links

Biography at King's College

Living people
Alumni of Somerville College, Oxford
Academics of King's College London
British economists
British women economists
English expatriates in Switzerland
Commanders of the Order of the British Empire
University of Neuchâtel alumni
Crossbench life peers
Life peeresses created by Elizabeth II
1949 births
Fellows of Somerville College, Oxford
Fellows of King's College London